Grönberg is a Swedish surname. Notable people with the surname include:

Martin Grönberg (born 1994), Swedish ice hockey player
Mathias Grönberg (born 1970), Swedish golfer
Raimo Grönberg, Finnish actor

Swedish-language surnames